The 2015 season is Lillestrøm's 39th consecutive year in Tippeligaen and their first with Rúnar Kristinsson as manager.

Squad

Transfers

Winter

In:

Out:

Summer

In:

Out:

Competitions

Tippeligaen

Results summary

Results by round

Fixtures

Table

Norwegian Cup

Squad statistics

Appearances and goals

|- 
|colspan="14"|Players away from Lillestrøm on loan:
|-
|colspan="14"|Players who appeared for Lillestrøm no longer at the club:

|}

Goal scorers

Disciplinary record

References

Lillestrøm SK seasons
Lillestrom